Ronald Boris Serich (18 June 1940 – 28 May 2009) was an Australian rules footballer who played with Richmond in the Victorian Football League (VFL).

Notes

External links 

1940 births
2009 deaths
Australian rules footballers from New South Wales
Richmond Football Club players
South Broken Hill Football Club players